The 2014 South American Games was a multi-sport event that took place in Santiago, Chile. It was the 10th edition of the ODESUR South American Games. Santiago hosted this event for the second time, the first being in 1986. Most of the events took place in and around the National Stadium. The games were held between March 7 to 18.

Participating nations 
14 countries competed at the games. 

 (510 athletes)
 (10)
 (121)
 (491)
 (575) (Host)
 (391)
 (264)
 (8)
 (41)
 (191)
 (261)
 (27)
 (235)
 (374)

Bid 
In 2006 Medellin won the bid for the 2010 edition 8 votes to 6, and the runner up Santiago will be organizing the next edition.

The Chilean government said they would invest US$800,000 for the games.

Sports 

 Aquatics
 
 
 
 
 
 
 
 
 
 
 Cycling
 BMX (2)
 Mountain biking (2)
 Road (4)
 Track (10)
 Equestrian
 Dressage (2)
 Jumping (2)
 
 
 
 
 
 Gymnastics
 Artistic gymnastics (14)
 Rhythmic gymnastics (6)
 
 
 
 
 Roller skating
 Figure skating (2)
 Speed skating (6)
 
 
 
 
 
 
 
 
 Volleyball 
 Volleyball (2)
 Beach volleyball (2)
 
 
 Wrestling
 Freestyle (11)
 Greco-Roman (6)

Venues 
 The Estadio Nacional Julio Martínez Prádanos is being renovated to seat 70,000 and get a new roof, inspired by Berlin's Olympiastadion.
 The Aquatic Center, Tennis Courts, Archery, Handball, Velodrome will be next to the Central Stadium.

Mascot 
The mascot for this edition of South American Games is Chago, which is based on an Andean condor. According to the organizers, the mascot symbolizes values of effort, dedication and teamwork.

Medal table

References

External links 
 Official website

 
South American Games
South American Games
South American Games
South American Games
Multi-sport events in Chile
International sports competitions hosted by Chile
Sports competitions in Santiago
2010s in Santiago, Chile
March 2014 sports events in South America